Joseph William DeNardo (November 27, 1930 – June 15, 2018) was an American meteorologist best known for his work at WTAE-TV in Pittsburgh.  He was known for his 1994 campaign, "Joe Said It Would."  DeNardo resided in Moon Township, Pennsylvania, with his wife of almost 60 years.  When he retired in 2005, after 45 years on the air, he enjoyed "iconic" status among Pittsburghers.

Biography

Early life
Joe DeNardo was born and raised in Martins Ferry, Ohio, and attended Wheeling Central Catholic High School in Wheeling, West Virginia.  While at Wheeling Central, DeNardo averaged a 4.0 GPA.  In addition, Joe was an outstanding basketball player, making the All-State team in both his Junior and Senior year.  His nickname on the court was "The Flash" due to his speed and quickness on the court.

DeNardo graduated from Duquesne University in 1952 with a major in Mathematics and Physics.  He was president of the Alpha Phi Delta fraternity. In 1953 he received a Masters in Meteorology from The University of Chicago.

He was an avid model railroadist.

Career
DeNardo started his career with the United States Air Force, providing weather reports to authorities.  DeNardo served four years in the Air Force, achieving the rank of Commander of the weather detachment at the Greater Pittsburgh Air Force Base. He was honorably discharged in 1956.

In 1957 he opened DeNardo and McFarland Weather Services with his friend David G. McFarland, whom he met in the Air Force.  "DeNardo and McFarland", located at the Allegheny County Airport, would sell weather forecasts to the Pittsburgh corporate aviation community (17 clients including Westinghouse, Rust Eng. and ALCOA), private aviation services, gas and electric utilities, construction and local radio stations.  The company also had a contract with Allegheny County, Pennsylvania, to consult on air quality issues.  Many of the US Weather Services (NWS) personnel located at the airport would work part-time for DeNardo & McFarland, one flight down.

KDKA-Channel 2 hired DeNardo in the late 1950s to brief its on-air weather personalities before every newscast. Eventually, Channel 2 managers asked him to do a few forecasts for the TV station's sibling radio station, KDKA-1020 AM. KDKA Radio started DeNardo broadcast career in 1957.  DeNardo and KDKA reached an agreement where he would broadcast his weather reports on television.  KDKA became one of the first stations in the country with a "real meteorologist" as a part of the programming and DeNardo began his regional fame and celebrity status.  After a new manager took over, DeNardo left KDKA, citing the unpleasant atmosphere.  DeNardo landed at WTAE-TV in 1969, bringing his news anchor partner Paul Long with him to WTAE, continuing their often sardonic banter when Long would introduce DeNardo for the weather segment of the news.  Joe was so popular that his presence at WTAE was the focus of an advertising campaign.

DeNardo retired from WTAE-TV on January 1, 2005.  He remained a presence on the station for fund-raising efforts, and continued to deliver his annual "Winter Weather Forecast" on WTAE-TV until 2009.

During the 2014 North American cold wave, the Pittsburgh Tribune-Review sought out DeNardo's opinion on the current state of weather reporting, nearly a decade after his retirement.

Sports commentator and long-time defender of Denardo, Pat McAfee, has described him as a DAWG.

Community work
DeNardo was known for his charitable work for the community.  DeNardo would make school visits every Wednesday "with the exception of holidays." He would fly into the school via helicopter and present an assembly for the kids. Traditionally, in return, DeNardo would receive a cake from the faculty of the schools. Along with school visits, DeNardo gave back to the community through The Salvation Army and his own actions.  WTAE-TV would host two charitable events each year that donated to The Salvation Army, the Project Bundle-Up Auction (which continues to this day), and the Bundle-Up telethon.  DeNardo hosted both of these events.

References 

1930 births
2018 deaths
American television meteorologists
Duquesne University alumni
Emmy Award winners
Journalists from Ohio
Journalists from Pennsylvania
Mass media in Pittsburgh
Military personnel from Ohio
People from Martins Ferry, Ohio
People from Moon Township, Allegheny County, Pennsylvania
Pittsburgh television reporters
Television personalities from Pittsburgh
United States Air Force officers
University of Chicago alumni
Weather presenters
Wheeling Central Catholic High School alumni